The mapping theorem is a theorem in the theory of point processes, a sub-discipline of probability theory. It describes how a Poisson point process is altered under measurable transformations. This allows construction of more complex Poisson point processes out of homogeneous Poisson point processes and can, for example, be used to simulate these more complex Poisson point processes in a similar manner to inverse transform sampling.

Statement 
Let  be locally compact and polish and let

be a measurable function.

References 

Poisson point processes